Gero Kretschmer (born 6 May 1985) is a German retired tennis player. He was a doubles specialist, who achieved his highest doubles ranking of world No. 79 in May 2014. He won his only ATP World Tour title with partner Alexander Satschko as alternates in Quito on 7 February 2015.

ATP career finals

Doubles: 1 (1 title)

ATP Challenger Tour finals

Doubles: 24 (9 titles, 15 runner-ups)

Doubles performance timeline

References

External links
 
 

1985 births
Living people
Tennis players from Cologne
German male tennis players
21st-century German people